Metatomoxia is a subgenus of beetles in the family Mordellidae, containing the following species:

Paratomoxia crux (Kônô, 1928)
Paratomoxia nipponica (Kônô, 1928)
Paratomoxia scutellata (Kônô, 1928)

References

Mordellidae
Insect subgenera